China High Speed Transmission Equipment Group Company, Ltd. or China High Speed Transmission, China High Speed, is a high-speed gear transmission equipment manufacturer in China. It is the largest wind power transmission gear manufacturer in China.

China High Speed Transmission was founded in 1969, formerly Nanjing Machine Tool Repairing Plant. In 1976, the plant was expanded and transformed to a gear manufacturer and changed its name to Nanjing Gear Box Factory. In 2001, the name was changed into an incorporated company.

It was listed on the Hong Kong Stock Exchange in July 2007 with its IPO price of HK$7.08 per share. It closed the day at HK$14.00, nearly twice its IPO.

References

External links

China High Speed Transmission Equipment Group Company, Ltd.

Wind power in China
Engineering companies of China
Wind turbine manufacturers
Manufacturing companies based in Nanjing
1969 establishments in China
Companies listed on the Hong Kong Stock Exchange
Chinese brands